Federica Di Criscio (born 12 May 1993) is an Italian football defender or midfielder who plays for Serie A club Napoli with whom she has also played the UEFA Women's Champions League. She featured for the senior Italy women's national football team at UEFA Women's Euro 2013.

International career
National coach Antonio Cabrini omitted Di Criscio from his selection for UEFA Women's Euro 2013, but called her into the squad when Elisabetta Tona was injured on the eve of the tournament.

Di Criscio made her first major tournament appearance when playing the last 21 minutes of Italy's quarter-final defeat to Germany.

References

External links
Soccerway profile

1993 births
Living people
Italian women's footballers
Italy women's international footballers
Serie A (women's football) players
A.S.D. AGSM Verona F.C. players
People from Lanciano
Women's association football midfielders
Women's association football central defenders
A.S. Roma (women) players
A.C.F. Brescia Calcio Femminile players
S.S.D. Napoli Femminile players
Avaldsnes IL players
Expatriate women's footballers in Norway
Italian expatriate sportspeople in Norway
Sportspeople from the Province of Chieti
Footballers from Abruzzo
UEFA Women's Euro 2017 players